Brighton Fringe is an open-access arts festival held annually in Brighton, England. It is the largest annual arts festival in England and one of the largest fringe festivals in the world. The programme of 2018 included 1008 events at over 166 venues across 4 weeks, in May and June.

Introduction 
Brighton Fringe runs at a similar time to Brighton Festival, and in 2013 extended its run to four weeks. 

One of the event's main objectives is to promote local talent and the arts. It also offers performers an opportunity for their event to be reviewed or picked up by promoters, as well as going on to Edinburgh. This is why anyone can put on a Brighton Fringe event.  In 2011 Brighton Fringe launched the Professional Development Programme, aimed at offering workshops to aspiring performers wanting to progress in the business. In 2012, Brighton Fringe opened its own on-street box office, which provided a physical base for the arts event, selling tickets as well as being a hub for promoters and performers. They also launched "Brighton in the Square", a showcase of Brighton Fringe performers at the Leicester Square Theatre in London.

As part of the 2012 Cultural Olympiad, Brighton Fringe introduced the Dip Your Toe project in 2012, which featured performances in six custom-built Victorian bathing machines, which were located throughout Brighton and Hove during the month of May. In 2014, the organisation launched an Arts Council England supported scheme called "Window" which showcases productions suitable for touring.

Brighton Fringe is a registered charity but does not rely on public funding, in fact, less than 3% of its income is generated from public sources. The other sources of revenue include participants’ registration fees, advertising, sponsorship and Friends memberships.

History 
Fringe activity has run alongside Brighton Festival since its creation in 1967. In 1972 Sussex University student Titus Alexander set up a society to stage fringe events, including a centenary play The Legend and True History of Aubrey Beardsley, with Christopher Pope as Beardsley, which went to the Edinburgh Fringe. 

The Fringe established itself as a limited company and registered charity in October 2006, with its own board of directors and complete financial independence from the Festival. In 2012 it rebranded itself as Brighton Fringe. In this period of time the organisation more than doubled in size, increasing from 323 shows in 2007 to 719 in 2012, bringing visitors into the city and boosting tourism and local businesses.

The programme of 2018 included two new seasons. The Freedom Season – a programme of events that are accessible to a range of audiences with access needs, including those with physical and invisible disabilities, and the Finnish Season. Furthermore, 2018 also saw the return of the Dutch Season and the return of late-night Fringe City.

The current CEO is Julian Caddy.

In 2020, Brighton Fringe was scheduled to run from 1 May until the 31 May; however due to the COVID-19 pandemic, the festival was rescheduled for an unconfirmed date in September or October 2020.

Open access 
Brighton Fringe is an open-access mixed arts event, which means it does not book performers, but is approached by people wishing to put events on and be part of the Fringe. Participants can vary from the complete beginner to the hardened professional show, and everything in between. Therefore, anyone can put an event on as part of Brighton Fringe. For example, in May 2019 - Unframed Lives was a photographic exhibition, panel event and installation for Brighton Fringe. It’s a creative collaboration between people who have experienced homelessness under austerity as a resistance project. It shows the use of art and research as a community dialogue to reflect on the lived experience of homeless people under austerity.

Venues 
A venue for Brighton Fringe can be anything; from a large concert hall or theatre to a private house, a park, or on one occasion, a bath. 

With the increase of large high-profile venues, some commentators have suggested that Brighton Fringe may be reaching a similar profile as the Edinburgh Fringe.

Fringe City 

In a similar vein to the use of the Royal Mile at the Edinburgh Festival Fringe, "Fringe City", a free event taking place in the New Road, Pavilion Gardens and Jubilee Street area of Brighton, was first introduced in 2007. By 2008, it was taking place every Saturday of May, and provides a showcase for any of the performers from the Fringe. In 2015, Fringe City saw audiences of 75,000, and in 2016, Fringe City saw audiences of 100.000, and takes place every weekend throughout the festival, alongside Family Picnic events on some weekends.

Fringe Academy 
Fringe Academy is a year-round programme of more than fifty free workshops providing skills-basked training, advice and support for individuals looking to expand their knowledge and understanding of the arts. Brighton Fringe brings thereby a host of experts from Brighton University and Arts Council England for instance, which secures a high level of learning.

Awards and Bursaries 
Every year Brighton Fringe hand out awards in the various categories to the best events and companies participating in the Fringe. Furthermore, Brighton Fringe works closely together with local and national organisations and companies to put together a number of bursaries and funding opportunities for Brighton Fringe participants.

References

External links
 

Festivals in Brighton and Hove
Fringe festivals in the United Kingdom
Theatre festivals in England
1967 establishments in England
Festivals established in 1967